The Millen Sisters (Sonya Nicole and Sabrina Antoinette Millen) are models/singers/actresses of African American descent, best known as models for Deborah Gregory, and singers for the Music City soundtrack. They are identical twins born to Steve and Mary Millen.

Early life
The twins started their singing career by participating in the Church choir. They performed at weddings, talent shows, minor league Baseball games, and at various Black history events.

Entertainment career
In 2008, the California Milk Processor Board, producers of the Got Milk? campaign, launched its "White Gold" campaign starring Sonya and Sabrina Millen as the Calcium Twins. The multi-faceted marketing effort was aimed at teenagers and featured "White Gold and The Calcium Twins", a fictional rock trio in a series of music videos, print ads, beauty products, websites and on over 750,000 schoolbook covers. The high point of the effort was the 2009 release of a 22-minute rock opera, "The Battle for Milkquarious", promoted as, "The most amazing rock opera ever made about milk". Ad agency Goodby Silverstein & Partners created six TV commercials to promote the effort with print ads appearing in Teen Vogue, Seventeen and CosmoGirl magazine.

The Millen Sisters modeled as Aquanetta Walker and Anginette Walker on the covers of The Cheetah Girls book series, although it is unclear which twin modeled as Aqua, and which one Angie. They also shot a candy commercial to be broadcast in Japan and performed at the Apollo Theater in Harlem. In 2002, while still in New Jersey, they contributed tracks to the independent film, Music City, and on October 23, 2002, they performed the National Anthem at the Los Angeles Clippers game. The Millen Sisters have also appeared in an MP3 commercial, a Red Hot Chili Peppers music video, and an episode of The Suite Life of Zack & Cody.

References

African-American actresses
Actresses from New Jersey
African-American girl groups
American musical duos
Female musical duos
Twin musical duos
Identical twin actresses
American identical twins
21st-century African-American women singers